The Georgia Interscholastic Association (GIA), formed in 1948, was a sports league of high schools serving African Americans in Georgia. It merged into the Georgia High School Association with desegregation in 1970. As If We Were Ghosts is a documentary film made about the league and its athletes. The Georgia Interscholastic Association held state championship competitions from 1948–70 and joined the Georgia High School Association the following year.

History
The Big 7 Conference included large high schools for African American students in Georgia. The GIA was an expansion of this league that grew to include county high schools around the state. High schools for African Americans from 147 of Georgia's 159 counties came to be included in the league.

Walt Frazier, Wyomia Tyus, Otis Sistrunk, Monk Johnson, Rayfield Wright. Don Adams, Willie Seay, and Edith McGuire emerged from the league. Seay went on to star on Albany State University's track team and carried the Olympic torch before the 1996 Olympics in Atlanta, Georgia.  Becky Taylor who works at the Tifton Gazette has been researching the league for years. Herb White, nicknamed the Elevator from Decatur, worked on the documentary film about the league. A high school basketball star he went on to play for the Atlanta Hawks.

The GIS grew to include high schools for African American students from 147 of Georgia's 159 counties. After the film was broadcast the filmmakers and some of those featured in the film participated in a panel discussion moderated by Ann Kimbrough.

High schools
 Henry McNeal Turner High School in northwest Atlanta
 Washington High School in southwest Atlanta
 South Fulton High School in East Point, Georgia
 Ballard-Hudson High School in Macon
 Alfred E. Beach High School in Savannah
 David T. Howard High School in Northeast Atlanta 
 Carver High School in Southeast Atlanta 
 South Fulton High School in East Point
 Josey High School in Augusta
 Central High School in Springfield
 Atkinson County Training High School in Pearson
 Appling High School in Macon
 Eva Thomas High School in College Park
 Harrison High School in West Point
 Risley High School in Brunswick
 Calhoun High School
 Carver High School in Dawson
 Lee Street High School in Blackshear
 Hutto High School in Bainbridge
 Macon County Training High School in Montezuma
 Holsey-Cobb Institute in Cordele
 Thomaston Training School in Wayne County 
 Training School in Jesup
 Hill High School in LaFayette
 Edison Negro High School
 Alma Consolidated High School
 Fairmont High School in Griffin	
 Richland High & Industrial
 Hunt High School in Fort Valley	
 Haralson County Consolidated High School in Waco
 Monitor High School in Fitzgerald
 Harrison High School in West Point
 South Fulton High School in East Point
 Central High School in McRae
 George W. Drake High School in Thomaston
 R. L. Cousins High School in Douglasville
 Bethune High School in Folkston
 West End School in Hogansville
 Ralph Bunche High School in Canton
 St. Pius X High School in Savannah
 Eureka School
 Liberty County High School 
 Bailey-Johnson School in Alpharetta
 Calhoun Crawford County Training School in Roberta
 Whitman Street High School in Toccoa
 Stephens High School in Calhoun
Lucy Craft Laney High School in Augusta, Georgia
Luther Judson Price High School in southeast Atlanta
Sophronia Tompkins High School (became Woodville-Tompkins)
Houston High School, Indians
Wilson High School
William H. Spencer High School in Columbus
Ralph Bunche High School
Dasher High School
Pinevale High School in Valdosta, the Fighting Tigers
Boggs Academy, a Presbyterian parochial school
Elm Street High School, now Rockmart Middle School
Cedar Hill High School in Cedartown, Georgia
William Bryant High School in Moultrie, formerly Moultrie High School for Negro Youth It became a junior high school after integration
Lemon Street High School of Marietta, the Hornets
Elder High School in Sandersville, Georgia
Maggie Califf High School in Gray, Georgia
Peabody High School in Eastman, Georgia

References

1970 mergers and acquisitions
Jim Crow
Discrimination
1948 establishments in Georgia (U.S. state)
Sports in Georgia (U.S. state)